Zhukovo is a rural locality (a village) in Novlenskoye Rural Settlement, Vologodsky District, Vologda Oblast, Russia. The population was 100 as of 2002.

Geography 
The distance to Vologda is 76 km, to Novlenskoye is 7 km. Plyushchevo, Oleshkovo, Podolets, Avdeyevo, Kelebardovo, Aleksino are the nearest rural localities.

References 

Rural localities in Vologodsky District